Monotheism and Justice Front: Supporters of the Government was an Iranian conservative electoral list for the 2012 legislative election. They were linked to Esfandiar Rahim Mashaei and Mahmoud Ahmadinejad.

See also
Political parties in Iran

References 

Principlist political groups in Iran
Electoral lists for Iranian legislative election, 2012